Kursk (UK: Kursk: The Last Mission, US: The Command) is a 2018 disaster drama-thriller film directed by Thomas Vinterberg, based on Robert Moore's book A Time to Die, about the true story of the 2000 Kursk submarine disaster. It stars Matthias Schoenaerts, Léa Seydoux, Peter Simonischek, August Diehl, Max von Sydow, and Colin Firth. It was the last film featuring von Sydow to be released before his death in March 2020.

Plot
The Russian Navy's Northern Fleet begins an exercise in the Barents Sea. The fleet deployed includes Kursk, an Oscar-class submarine. At sea, weapons officer Pavel Sonin reports that the interior temperature of a HTP torpedo is increasing rapidly, indicating a potential hydrogen peroxide leak. The captain however ignores Pavel's concerns and moments later the torpedo prematurely explodes, killing the weapons room crew. A secondary explosion of the remaining torpedoes rips a hole through the submarine's forward hull, sending the ship to the sea bed.

The surviving crew members rally at the aft-most compartment, now rapidly taking on water. The crew desperately await rescue, while on dry land the sailor's wives begin to hear rumours regarding the submarine. Royal Navy Commodore David Russell detects the seismic events and deduces that Kursk has had an accident. Admiral Grudzinsky, commander of the Northern Fleet, initially believes there are no survivors, but once tapping is heard through the hull of the submarine, the Russians immediately deploy a rescue submersible. The old and poorly maintained craft can not form a seal on the Kursks hull, and is forced to return to the surface and wait for a 12-hour battery recharge.

Meanwhile, the survivors begin to run low on air, requiring two crew members to swim into a flooded compartment to retrieve oxygen cartridges. Another rescue attempt is made, but the submersible again cannot form a seal on the hull. On land, the sailors' families, wives and friends grow resentful of the repeated stone-walling by the Russian Admiralty, who also reject foreign offers of help in fear of exposing Russian naval secrets. Despite this, Admiral Grudzinsky accepts an earlier offer from Russell, but Grudzinsky is relieved of command shortly afterwards. The Russian Navy orders Russell, along with British and Norwegian divers, not to approach the Kursk. A third Russian attempt to rescue the survivors is made, but again the Russian submersible still cannot force a seal, and the Russians ultimately and finally agree to foreign assistance.

Aboard the Kursk, the crew in an attempt to raise morale, enjoy a "breakfast buffet", during which a crew member accidentally knocks an oxygen cartridge into the water, causing a flash fire that consumes the remaining oxygen. With minutes of breathable air, the crew say their goodbyes whilst singing "The Sailor's Band". Russell's divers arrive too late at the submarine, finding the entire hull flooded and the crew dead. At the funeral, Misha, son of one of the sailors on board, refuses to shake Admiral Petrenko's hand. A land-based member of the crew gives Misha his father's maritime watch; his father had earlier sold it so that he could buy champagne for Pavel Sonin's wedding.

Cast

Michael Nyqvist filmed scenes which were deleted from the final cut.

Production

Development
On 17 August 2015, it was announced that EuropaCorp was developing a film based on the 2000 K-141 Kursk submarine disaster, and that Martin Zandvliet had been hired to direct the film from a script by Robert Rodat, based on Robert Moore's 2002 book A Time to Die. Kursk would have been Zandvliet's first English-language film. On 21 January 2016, it was reported that Zandvliet was no longer attached and that EuropaCorp had hired Thomas Vinterberg to direct the film.

On 2 March 2016, Matthias Schoenaerts was announced in the cast, reteaming with Vinterberg after Far from the Madding Crowd (2015). Colin Firth joined the cast on 26 May 2016. Léa Seydoux joined the cast on 7 February 2017, in the role of Tanya, the wife of Mikhail Averin, a Russian Navy captain-lieutenant played by Matthias Schoenaerts. Rachel McAdams was once in talks for the role of Tanya. Deadline Hollywood also reported that Firth would play David Russell, a British naval commander going against Russia's warnings to try to save the men on the Kursk.

On 15 March 2017, it was reported that Vladimir Putin's character had been cut from the film before an actor was cast for the role. According to The Hollywood Reporter, EuropaCorp's president, Luc Besson, wanted to shift the story's focus to the rescue mission rather than the politics behind the disaster. One theory noted by The Hollywood Reporter is that nobody at EuropaCorp wanted to be hacked. (The film The Interview had angered Kim Jong-un and was believed to have sparked the Sony hack in 2014.) Putin had been Russian president for eight months when the tragedy had occurred. He was supposed to appear as a supporting character in at least five scenes and was sympathetically portrayed in the original Kursk script, which highlighted why he had taken the tragedy personally (Putin's father had been a submariner).

Pre-production
On 8 May 2017, Peter Simonischek, Max von Sydow and Michael Nyqvist were announced in the cast. However, Nyqvist died on 27 June.

Alexandre Desplat composed the movie score. The crew includes Catherine Marchand as the costume designer, Anthony Dod Mantle as the director of photography, Thierry Flamand as the production designer and Valdis Oskardottir as the film's editor.

Subject matter experts such as journalist Robert Moore (author of the novel upon which the film is based), David Russell (British Royal Navy commodore who had tried to save the men from the Kursk), and submarine expert Ramsey Martin acted as advisors for the film.

The project was produced by France's EuropaCorp with Belgium's Belga Productions and Luxembourg's VIA EST.

Filming
Shooting was scheduled to start in September 2016, but it had to be postponed due to Russia's defence ministry not issuing a permit for shooting in the country, which would run for about a month. According to The Hollywood Reporter, Russia's defense ministry originally promised cooperation with the crew to provide realism to the movie. However, later it reportedly grew concerned about granting access to classified information and sensitive locations. On 7 February 2017, ScreenDaily.com reported that shooting was scheduled to start in April.

Filming started at the Naval base of Toulon, France, on 26 April 2017. Some scenes were filmed with Colin Firth at the commercial port of Brest, France, between 2 May and 6 May 2017, including scenes aboard the rescue ship Atlantic Tonjer, serving as the Seaway Eagle. On 8 May 2017, it was reported that shooting would take place not only in France but also in locations throughout Europe, including Belgium and Norway. On 12 July 2017, the crew was in Jette (Brussels) and scenes were filmed in "Salle Excelsior" (Place Cardinal Mercier).

Release
The film premiered at the Toronto International Film Festival on 6 September 2018, where Thomas Vinterberg (director) and Artemiy Spiridonov (actor) presented the film in English and Russian languages. The film was scheduled to be released through DirecTV Cinema on 23 May 2019, before being released in a limited release on 21 June 2019, by Saban Films.

Reception
The website's consensus reads, "The Command plumbs the depths of real-life disaster to tell an uneven yet reasonably diverting story of lives caught between bureaucracy and certain doom." On Metacritic, the film has a weighted average score of 55 out of 100, based on results from 12 critics, indicating "mixed or average reviews".

See also
 List of Submarine films

References

External links
 

2018 films
2010s disaster films
Belgian drama films
Belgian disaster films
French drama films
French disaster films
Luxembourgian drama films
EuropaCorp films
Saban Films films
Disaster films based on actual events
2010s English-language films
English-language Belgian films
English-language French films
English-language Luxembourgian films
Films about seafaring accidents or incidents
Films about survivors of seafaring accidents or incidents
Films based on non-fiction books
Films scored by Alexandre Desplat
Films set in Russia
Films shot in France
Films shot in Belgium
Films shot in Norway
Films directed by Thomas Vinterberg
Seafaring films based on actual events
Submarine films
2018 drama films
2010s French films